The Grell Mystery is a 1917 American silent mystery film directed by Paul Scardon and written by Graham Baker.  The film stars Earle Williams, Miriam Miles, and Jean Dunbar.

Cast list

References

American silent feature films
1910s mystery drama films
American black-and-white films
1917 films
1917 drama films
American mystery drama films
Films directed by Paul Scardon
1910s American films
Silent American drama films
Silent mystery films